Bernard Villemot (1911, Trouville-sur-Mer – 1989) was a French graphic artist known primarily for his iconic advertising images for Orangina, Bally Shoe, Perrier, and Air France.  He was known for a sharp artistic vision that was influenced by photography, and for his ability to distill an advertising message to a memorable image with simple, elegant lines and bold colors.

Biography
From 1932 to 1934, he studied in Paris with artist Paul Colin, who was considered a master of Art Deco. From 1945 to 1946, Villemot prepared posters for the Red Cross. In the late 1940s, he also began a famous series of travel posters for Air France that would continue for decades. In 1949, Villemot's works were exhibited with those of his contemporary poster artist Raymond Savignac at the Gallery of Beaux Arts in Paris. In 1953, Villemot began designing logos and posters for the new soft drink Orangina, and over time these works would become some of his best known. In 1963, the Museum of Decorative Arts in Paris held an exhibition of his works. By the end of his life in 1989, he was known as one of the last great poster artists, and many collectors and critics consider him to be the "painter-laureate of modern commercial art."

Since his death in 1989, his memorable images have been increasingly sought after by collectors. At least three books have been published that survey his art: "Les affiches de Villemot," by Jean-Francois Bazin (1985); "Villemot: l’affiche de A à Z," by Guillaume Villemot (2005); and "Embracing an icon: the posters of Bernard Villemot," by George H. Bon Salle (2015).

References

1911 births
1989 deaths
People from Trouville-sur-Mer
French graphic designers
French poster artists
Académie Julian alumni